Lucha Reyes  may refer to:

Lucha Reyes (Peruvian singer)
Lucha Reyes (Mexican singer)